= Yves di Manno =

French poet and translator

Yves di Manno is a French poet and translator. He was born in 1954. He is the author of more than twenty books, including Partitions (1995) and Un pré (2003). He also translated poets such as William Carlos Williams and Ezra Pound. In addition, he has published novels and short story collections such as Disparaître (1997) and Domicile (2002).

He ran the Poésie/Flammarion imprint for many years.
